Dasycoelopa is a genus of kelp flies in the family Coelopidae.

Species
Dasycoelopa australis Malloch, 1933

References

Coelopidae
Sciomyzoidea genera